Marcos Pitombo (born Marcos Menezes Magalhães Pitombo on June 17, 1982 in Rio de Janeiro) is a Brazilian actor.

Filmography

TV series
 2007 - Malhação - Siri
 2008 - Os Mutantes - Valente
 2009 - Promessas de Amor - José da Silva Valente
 2010 - A História de Ester - Assuero
 2011 - Vidas em Jogo - Lucas Coelho
 2013 - Pecado Mortal - Ramiro
 2014 - Vitória - Paulão
 2015 - Babilônia - Iuri 
 2017 - Haja Coração - Felipe Miranda
 2018 - Orgulho e Paixão - Rômulo Tibúrcio
 2020 - Salve Se Quem Puder - Bruno Dantas

Cinema
 2008 - Era Uma Vez - Dudu
 2012 - Até que a Sorte nos Separe - Tino (jovem)

External links 

1982 births
Living people
21st-century Brazilian male actors
Male actors from Rio de Janeiro (city)
Brazilian male film actors
Brazilian male television actors